Louis Winfred Hardie (August 24, 1864 in New York – March 5, 1929 in Oakland, California) was a professional baseball catcher in Major League Baseball from 1884 to 1891. He played for the Chicago White Stockings, Philadelphia Quakers, Boston Beaneaters, and Baltimore Orioles.

External links

1864 births
1929 deaths
Major League Baseball catchers
Chicago White Stockings players
Philadelphia Quakers players
Baltimore Orioles (AA) players
Boston Beaneaters players
19th-century baseball players
San Francisco Haverlys players
San Francisco Occidental players
Richmond Virginians (minor league) players
LaCrosse Freezers players
Oakland Greenhood & Morans players
Oakland Colonels players
San Francisco Metropolitans players
Oakland Reliance players
Oakland Oaks (baseball) players
Baseball players from New York (state)